St Aidan’s College was a Church of England theological college in Birkenhead, Cheshire, England, open from 1847 to 1970.

History 

The college was founded in 1846 by Revd Dr Joseph Baylee, vicar of Birkenhead, with the approval of John Bird Sumner, Bishop of Chester. Initially a Parochial Assistance Association, it had taken on the name of a college by 1847.

From 1847 it was housed in five rented houses in Cambridge Terrace on Slatey Road, Prenton.

In 1856, it was formally inaugurated as a theological college with 63 students. Its purpose was to train Anglican clergy to serve in the Church of England, in particular in the rapidly expanding cities and towns of Merseyside. New buildings at Shrewsbury Road, Birkenhead, were designed by Henry Cole and inaugurated in November 1856.

The college closed in 1868, with the departure of its founder Dr Baylee.  It re-opened in 1869 under a new council, who appointed as principal William Saumarez Smith, who, like Baylee, had strong evangelical credentials.

From 1876 the college was associated with Durham University, and its students were allowed to take the university's Licence in Theology.

A new chapel opened in 1882.

In 1891, Edwin Elmer Harding, vice-principal of Lichfield Theological College, was appointed principal. Unlike previous principals, he was not of an evangelical persuasion, and brought with him other staff from high-church foundations such as Lichfield and Keble College, Oxford. The practices of the newly-appointed staff caused increasing concern from the council, and in 1900 Harding returned to Lichfield as principal, and was replaced with evangelical Arthur Tait, who appointed Guy Warman as his vice-principal as his vice-principal. Warman succeeded Tait as principal in 1907, before going on to become Bishop of Truro, Chelmsford and Manchester.

In 1904, the college became affiliated to the newly-founded University of Liverpool, while its connection to Durham University was strengthened with the founding of St John's Hall in 1910.

A new dining hall was added to the college in 1912.

In the late 1960s, the college suffered from a decline in numbers of students. Various plans were suggested to allow the college to merge with another college, including the Northern Congregational College in Manchester - perhaps the reason why St Aidan's in 1967 gained recognition from the University of Manchester.

However, none of these plans came to fruition, and the college closed in summer 1969. Its buildings were auctioned, and demolished to allow the erection of a housing estate.

The name has been continued at St Mellitus North West; and its archives are located at the University of Liverpool.

Notable staff
 Ronald Williams, tutor: later Principal of St John's College, Durham and Bishop of Leicester

Principals

1856–1868 Joseph Baylee
1869–1890 William Saumarez Smith
1890- Rev J T Kingsmill BD
1890–1900 Edwin Elmer Harding
1900–1907 Arthur Tait
1907–1916 Guy Warman
1922 Rev R. T. Howard
1959–1963 Michael Murray Hennell
1964- Canon Arthur G Widess

Alumni
Notable alumni include:
Robert Atherton, poet
John Foster, Dean of St John's Cathedral, Hong Kong
Raphael Morgan, Eastern Orthodox Priest-Apostolic to America
Stephen Moulsdale, first principal of St Chad's College, Durham
Ishaq Musaad, Bishop of Egypt
Herbert Parry, Archdeacon of Lindsey
Snow Pendleton, priest in Uruguay and Italy
Fred Pickering, Archdeacon of Hampstead
Francis Pocock, the founder of Monkton Combe School
Arthur Herbert Procter, recipient of the Victoria Cross
Leonard Sharland, missionary to the Dinka people
Percy Stevens, missionary and Bishop of Kwangsi-Hunan

Notes

Educational institutions established in 1846
Anglican seminaries and theological colleges
Former theological colleges in England
Education in Birkenhead
1846 establishments in England
Alumni of St Aidans College Birkenhead